Minuscule 239 (in the Gregory-Aland numbering), A147 (Soden), is a Greek minuscule manuscript of the New Testament, on parchment. Palaeographically, it has been assigned to the 11th century.

Description 

The codex contains the text of the  Mark 16:2-8; Luke 1:1-53; 1:70-24:53; John 1:1-16:23 on 277 parchment leaves (size ). The biblical text is surrounded by a commentary (catena).

Text 

Kurt Aland did not place the Greek text of the codex in any Category. It was not examined by the Claremont Profile Method.

History 

The manuscript belonged to the monastery Pantocrator at Athos peninsula. It was brought to Moscow, by the monk Arsenius, on the suggestion of the Patriarch Nikon, in the reign of Alexei Mikhailovich Romanov (1645-1676). The manuscript was collated by C. F. Matthaei.

The manuscript is currently housed at the State Historical Museum (V. 84, S. 46) at Moscow.

See also 

 List of New Testament minuscules
 Biblical manuscript
 Textual criticism

References

Further reading 

 C. F. Matthaei, Novum Testamentum Graece et Latine (Riga, 1782). (as g)
 Kurt Treu, Die Griechischen Handschriften des Neuen Testaments in der UdSSR; eine systematische Auswertung des Texthandschriften in Leningrad, Moskau, Kiev, Odessa, Tbilisi und Erevan, T & U 90 (Berlin, 1966), pp. 264–265.

External links 
 

Greek New Testament minuscules
11th-century biblical manuscripts